HMS Ambrose was a steamship that was built for in 1903 as a passenger liner. The Booth Steam Ship Company ran her scheduled on services between Liverpool and Brazil until the First World War.

Ambrose was converted into a Royal Navy armed merchant cruiser (AMC) in 1914–15 and then into a submarine depot ship in 1917. After the First World War she supported Royal Navy submarines in the Far East from 1919 until 1928, when she was laid up in the Reserve Fleet.

In 1938 Ambrose was renamed HMS Cochrane and converted into a destroyer depot ship. Cochrane survived the Second World War and was scrapped in 1946.

Building
Sir Raylton Dixon and Company of Middlesbrough built Ambrose for £89,000. She was launched on 31 March 1903 and completed that September.

Ambrose had one screw. The North Eastern Marine Engineering Company built her three-cylinder triple-expansion steam engine.

Ambrose was registered at Liverpool. Her UK official number was 118405 and her code letters were VFSJ.

Civilian service
Booth's operated scheduled cargo liner and passenger services between Europe and Brazil. In the first decade of the 20th century these services included regular sailings between Liverpool and Manaus,  up the Amazon River. A Booth passenger ship would leave Liverpool for Manaus on or about the 10th, 20th and 30th day of each month. Ambroses maiden voyage from Liverpool to Manaus began on either 20 September or 7 October 1903.

In 1906 Ambrose ran aground in Brazil. She had sailed from Liverpool on 30 August, called at Leixões in Portugal, and on 26 September reached Manaus. At 1000 hrs on 3 October she left Manaus on her return journey. At 1515 hrs she reached Para na' Trinidade, some miles downriver on the Amazon, where she ran aground and suffered damage. Ambrose remained at Para na' Trinidade for a week, and reached Liverpool on 27 October.

Booth Line took Ambroses need for repair as an opportunity to increase her passenger capacity. On 28 October she left Liverpool for Hebburn on the River Tyne, where R&W Hawthorn, Leslie and Company repaired her hull, lengthened her poop deck and added berths for another 150 passengers. Work was completed on 30 March 1907 and cost £17,000.

By 1914 Ambrose was equipped for wireless telegraphy, operated by the Marconi Company. Her call sign was MDR.

Armed merchant cruiser
On 20 November 1914 the British Admiralty requisitioned Ambrose for conversion into an AMC. She was armed with eight 4.7 inch guns and two 6-pounder guns, and commissioned on 10 December 1914 as HMS Ambrose by Commander Charles William Bruton, R.N.,  with the pennant number M 87.

Ambrose served in the 10th Cruiser Squadron as part of the Allied Blockade of Germany. She patrolled between the British Isles, Iceland and Norway.

On 11 March off the west coast of Scotland a submarine attacked Ambrose three times. The second attack was at 1405 hrs, when a torpedo passed astern of her. The third attack was at 1422 hrs. On each occasion Ambrose opened fire on the periscope. After the third encounter the attacks ceased, and Ambroses officers suspected that she had sunk the submarine.

On 6 May submarines attacked Ambrose off Skerryvore.

Ambroses patrols with the 10th Cruiser Squadron ended in September 1915, when she reached port in Glasgow. On 13 October she transferred to Greenock and on 20 October her crew was paid off. Also on 20 October, the Admiralty bought Ambrose from Booth Line.

Submarine depot ship
In 1917 Ambrose was converted into a submarine depot ship. In this rôle her complement was 238 officers and enlisted men. She was stationed at Berehaven, Ireland in January 1918 and transferred to Falmouth, Cornwall in November. In 1919 she was stationed at Devonport. From 19 September 1918 until 30 October 1920 her commander was Commander Cecil Talbot.

Ambrose and her submarines reached Hong Kong in January 1920.

Ambrose spent long periods at the Royal Navy bases in Hong Kong and Weihaiwei. She also visited Kobe and Shanghai in 1920, Nagasaki and Kobe in 1921 and Singapore in 1923.

In 1928 Ambrose and six L-class submarines were recalled to Britain. They left Hong Kong on 28 March, reached Singapore on 3 April and left Singapore on 8 April. On 4 December Ambrose was paid off into the Maintenance Reserve at Rosyth.

Final years
On 1 June 1938 Ambrose was renamed HMS Cochrane. Some sources say that she was converted into a destroyer depot ship. Another source describes her Second World War rôle as a "base ship". In 1946 Cochrane was decommissioned and that November she was scrapped by ship breakers Thos. W. Ward at Inverkeithing.

References

Bibliography

External links 
 

1903 ships
World War I Auxiliary cruisers of the Royal Navy
Merchant ships of the United Kingdom
Ocean liners of the United Kingdom
Royal Navy Submarine Depot Ships
Ships of the Booth Steamship Company
Ships built on the River Tees
Steamships of the United Kingdom
Submarine tenders
World War I naval ships of the United Kingdom
World War II auxiliary ships of the United Kingdom